Khatif (also Romanized as Khaṭīf; also known as Khaṭīf) is a village in Qaleh Askar Rural District, Lalehzar District, Bardsir County, Kerman Province, Iran. At the 2006 census, its population was 106, in 24 families.

References 

Populated places in Bardsir County